Okada (written: 岡田 literally "hill rice-paddy") is a Japanese surname. Notable people with the name include:

, Japanese painter
 Doris Okada Matsui, American politician of the Democratic Party
 , Japanese painter in the Edo period
, Japanese cyclist
, Japanese contemporary artist
, Japanese samurai and assassin
, IJN Captain
 John Okada (1923–1971), Japanese-American writer
, Japanese singer and actor
, Japanese voice actress
, former Democratic Party of Japan president and foreign minister of Japan
, Japanese professional wrestler
, Japanese businessman and billionaire, the biggest project of whom is Okada Manilla (see below)
, 31st Prime Minister of Japan
, Japanese photographer
, Japanese screenwriter
, Japanese actor
 Masumi Okada (1935–2006), Japanese-Danish actor
, founder of the Church of World Messianity
, Japanese actress and former idol singer
, Japanese idol, model and actress
, Japanese snowboarder
, Japanese painter
, general manager of Nintendo Research & Engineering
, Japanese Samurai
, Japanese architect
, Japanese slalom canoeist
, Japanese politician
, former Grand Prix motorcycle racing and Superbike racing motorcycle racer
, coach of the Japan national football team
, Japanese general
, Japanese actor
, Japanese new media art and design curator
, founder of the anime company Gainax
, Japanese zoologist
, Japanese actress
Yuki Okada (disambiguation), multiple people
, Japanese idol

Other uses 
 Okada Domain, a Japanese domain in the Edo period
 Okada Station (Ehime), a railway station in Ehime, Japan
 Okada Station (Kagawa), a railway station in Kagawa, Japan
 Okada Museum of Art, an art museum in Kanagawa, Japan
 Okada Manila, a casino resort and hotel complex in Parañaque City, Metro Manila which is the biggest project of Kazuo Okada (see above)
 Okada (motorcycle taxi), a motorcycle taxi used in western Africa
 Okada Air, a now defunct airline in Nigeria

Japanese-language surnames